Sangrama Assembly constituency is one of the 87 constituencies in the Jammu and Kashmir Legislative Assembly.Sangrama  Legislative Assembly is part of Baramulla Lok Sabha Constituency.  

It consists of Wagoora, Kreeri and Khoie Tehsils.

Members of Legislative Assembly

Election results

2014

See also
 Sangrama
 List of constituencies of Jammu and Kashmir Legislative Assembly

References

Assembly constituencies of Jammu and Kashmir
Bandipora district